Proximal gradient methods are a generalized form of projection used to solve non-differentiable convex optimization problems. 

Many interesting problems can be formulated as convex optimization problems of the form

where  are possibly non-differentiable convex functions. The lack of differentiability rules out conventional smooth optimization techniques like the steepest descent method and the conjugate gradient method, but proximal gradient methods can be used instead. 

Proximal gradient methods starts by a splitting step, in which the functions  are used individually so as to yield an easily implementable algorithm. They are called proximal because each non-differentiable function among  is involved via its proximity operator. Iterative shrinkage thresholding algorithm, projected Landweber, projected gradient, alternating projections, alternating-direction method of multipliers, alternating
split Bregman are special instances of proximal algorithms. 

For the theory of proximal gradient methods from the perspective of and with applications to statistical learning theory, see proximal gradient methods for learning.

Projection onto convex sets (POCS) 

One of the widely used convex optimization algorithms is projections onto convex sets (POCS). This algorithm is employed to recover/synthesize a signal satisfying simultaneously several convex constraints. Let  be the indicator function of non-empty closed convex set  modeling a constraint. This reduces to convex feasibility problem, which require us to find a solution such that it lies in the intersection of all convex sets . In POCS method each set  is incorporated by its projection operator . So in each iteration  is updated as
 
However beyond such problems projection operators are not appropriate and more general operators are required to tackle them. Among the various generalizations of the notion of a convex projection operator that exist, proximity operators are best suited for other purposes.

Examples 
Special instances of Proximal Gradient Methods are
Projected Landweber
Alternating projection
Alternating-direction method of multipliers

See also 
 Proximal operator
 Proximal gradient methods for learning
 Frank–Wolfe algorithm

Notes

References

External links
 Stephen Boyd and Lieven Vandenberghe Book, Convex optimization
 EE364a: Convex Optimization I and EE364b: Convex Optimization II, Stanford course homepages
 EE227A: Lieven Vandenberghe Notes Lecture 18
 ProximalOperators.jl: a Julia package implementing proximal operators.
 ProximalAlgorithms.jl: a Julia package implementing algorithms based on the proximal operator, including the proximal gradient method.
 Proximity Operator repository: a collection of proximity operators implemented in Matlab and Python.

Gradient methods